The second series of the British version of The Masked Singer  premiered on ITV on 26 December 2020, following a "The Story So Far" recap episode which aired on 19 December, and concluded on 13 February 2021. The series was won by singer Joss Stone as "Sausage", with singer Ne-Yo finishing second as "Badger", and singer Aston Merrygold placing third as "Robin".

Production
On 25 January 2020, it was announced that the show would be returning for a second series. On 30 April 2020, it was reported that they were considering filming the new series without an audience due to the COVID-19 pandemic. It was later announced on 17 August 2020 that filming would begin on 14 September with safety precautions in place.

Panellists and host

Following the announcement of the series, it was confirmed by ITV that Jonathan Ross, Davina McCall and Rita Ora would all return to the panel for the second series. It was also confirmed that Joel Dommett would also return as host.

On 19 August 2020, it was announced that British comedian Mo Gilligan would replace Ken Jeong on the panel for series two, due to travel restrictions from COVID-19 preventing his participation.

Guest panellists included Alan Carr in the sixth episode, Matt Lucas in the seventh episode, and series one winner, Nicola Roberts, in the eighth episode.

Contestants
A 10-second teaser revealing the first two costumes was released in November 2020. The series has 12 contestants.

Episodes

Episode 1 (26 December)

Episode 2 (2 January)

Episode 3 (9 January)

Episode 4 (16 January)

Episode 5 (23 January)

Episode 6 (30 January)
Group number: "That's Not My Name" by The Ting Tings

Episode 7: Semi-final (6 February) 
Group number: "Superstar" by Jamelia

Episode 8: Final (13 February)
Group number: "I'm Coming Out" by Diana Ross

Ratings
Official ratings are taken from BARB, utilising the four-screen dashboard which includes viewers who watched the programme on laptops, smartphones, and tablets within 7 days of the original broadcast.

References

2020 British television seasons
2021 British television seasons
The Masked Singer (British TV series)